Rosemont College is a private Catholic liberal arts college in Rosemont, Pennsylvania. Founded in 1921 as a women's college by the Sisters of the Holy Child Jesus, the undergraduate program opened to male students beginning in fall 2009. Rosemont is a member of the Southeastern Pennsylvania Consortium for Higher Education (SEPCHE) and 
is accredited by the Middle States Commission on Higher Education (MSCHE). Rosemont also offers a range of master's degrees through its School of Graduate Studies and School of Professional Studies.

History
Founded in 1921 by the Society of the Holy Child Jesus, Rosemont College is an independent liberal arts institution in the Catholic tradition located in eastern Pennsylvania. In the fall of 2009, the traditionally women's undergraduate college began accepting male students.

The traditional Undergraduate College confers B.A., B.S., and B.F.A. degrees in twenty-four majors. Rosemont College also includes the Schools of Graduate and Professional Studies offering degrees and certificates at the master's level.

One of the oldest Catholic women's colleges in the region, Rosemont originally "had a reputation for educating the daughters of more well-to-do Catholics."

Rosemont's first chairman of the board was Cardinal Dougherty, who was instrumental in gaining Rosemont its first accreditation from the Middle States Association of Colleges and Secondary Schools by personally guaranteeing the college's financial solvency.

Bishop Fulton J. Sheen was likewise involved in the early life of the college, describing Rosemont as "the finest girls' college in the United States."

During World War II, Rosemont students aided the war effort by selling war bonds serving as air-raid wardens while the college hosted Villanova College's summer programs as Villanova's campus was in use during the summers by the United States Navy.

However, Rosemont evolved over the course of the twentieth century; "As views on women changed, the original—what some would call convent—atmosphere gradually moved toward more freedom for students to come and go, later curfews, and greater interaction with college men."

In 1963, Rosemont students insisted that the college begin bringing non-Catholic speakers to campus, and by the early 1970s, the college ceased holding religious retreats due to lack of attendance.

Campus

In 1927, the Sisters of the Holy Child of Jesus acquired the former home of Joseph F. Sinnott, known both as Rathalla and as the Joseph Sinnott Mansion for $1.00 to serve as the school campus.

The English origins of the Sisters of the Holy Child influenced the campus architecture and layout. Unlike other local Catholic colleges, Rosemont's campus eschewed cloistered buildings and convent motifs in favor of a campus with "modestly-sized buildings arranged around a gentle rise in the landscape.... Students found it easy to walk to the Rosemont train station or to the shops in nearby Bryn Mawr, which was very different from the relative isolation encountered by students at Chestnut Hill and especially at Immaculata."

The college's Immaculate Conception Chapel is one of only two chapels in the United States whose stained-glass windows depict only women, a project conceived by Rosemont's second president, Mother Mary Ignatius Carroll.

Academics
Programs are accredited by the Middle States Commission on Higher Education.

Undergraduate College
The Undergraduate College offers 24 majors, awarding Bachelor of Arts, Bachelor of Fine Arts, and Bachelor of Science degrees. Each program offers an in-depth study of a particular subject area, as well as a breadth of study in the liberal arts. Rosemont's majors are:

Rosemont offers teacher certification programs in elementary education and secondary education, as well as pre-professional programs in dentistry, optometry, veterinary science, medicine, and law.

Rosemont College has developed inter-institutional cooperative agreements with Villanova University, Eastern University, Arcadia University, Cabrini College, Chestnut Hill College, Gwynedd Mercy University, Holy Family University, Immaculata University, and Neumann University. These agreements allow for cross-registration and the sharing of library resources between the institutions.

Rosemont also offers study abroad programs, internships, individualized majors, an early assurance medical program and other Nursing Programs with Drexel University College of Medicine, accelerated BA and MA programs, and the Cornelian Scholars program for early acceptance to Rosemont's graduate programs.

Rosemont offers a 7-year BA/BS/MD Fast Track medical program with Drexel University College of Medicine in which students study for 3 years at Rosemont and after passing the required scores on the MCAT, move onto Drexel College of Medicine. The college also offers an 8-year BA/BS/MD Early Assurance medical program.

School of Graduate Studies
Rosemont College's School of Graduate Studies offers seven co-educational graduate programs. Its M.F.A. in Creative Writing was listed as an "M.F.A. Program to Watch" by Publishers Weekly in 2015.

School of Professional Studies
The School of Professional Studies offers accelerated degree programs, certificates, and corporate training. The accelerated degree programs are completed in five-week sessions, normally meeting once a week for four hours. The accelerated graduate courses are completed in seven-week sessions or over a weekend.

The School of Professional Studies offer the following undergraduate and graduate degrees and certifications.

Athletics
Rosemont, known athletically as the Ravens, is a Division III member of the National Collegiate Athletic Association (NCAA) and is a charter member of the Colonial States Athletic Conference (CSAC).

Men's sports include baseball, basketball, cross country, golf, lacrosse, soccer; tennis and outdoor track & field (in 2023–24); while women's sports include basketball, cross country, lacrosse, soccer, softball, tennis, golf, volleyball, outdoor track & field (in 2023–24) and lacrosse (in 2023–24). Rosemont's Athletic Complex is home to a fully gray synthetic turf multi-purpose field, the first all gray field in the United States. The baseball team will play its first season during the college's centennial.

Notable alumnae
Mari Carmen Aponte, United States Ambassador to El Salvador
Virginia Samaras Bauer, 9/11 survivors activist
Pat Ciarrocchi, news reporter
Marion Donovan, inventor of the disposable diaper
Linda Fiorentino, actress
Patricia Kennedy Lawford, socialite and philanthropist
Patricia McCormick, journalist and author
Rosalind Russell, actress, winner of five Golden Globes and a Tony Award
Claudine Schneider, former congressional representative from Rhode Island

References

External links

 Official website
 Official athletics website

 
Educational institutions established in 1921
Lower Merion Township, Pennsylvania
Society of the Holy Child Jesus
Universities and colleges in Montgomery County, Pennsylvania
Catholic universities and colleges in Pennsylvania
1921 establishments in Pennsylvania
Former women's universities and colleges in the United States
Association of Catholic Colleges and Universities
Liberal arts colleges in Pennsylvania